Álvares (sometimes Alvares), a Portuguese language and Galician surname, originally a patronymic meaning Son of Álvaro, is the name of: 
Ana Ida Alvares (born 1965), Brazilian volleyball player
Francisco Álvares (1465–1541), Portuguese missionary and explorer
João Álvares Fagundes (active in 1521), Portuguese explorer
Jorge Álvares (died 1521), Portuguese explorer
Mara Alvares (born 1948), Brazilian artist
Nuno Álvares Pereira (1360–1431), Portuguese general and constable of Portugal
Pedro Álvares Cabral (about 1467 – about 1520), Portuguese navigator and explorer, discoverer of Brazil

See also
Alvarez (disambiguation), The anglicization of Álvarez
Álvarez (surname), the Spanish variant of the surname

References

Galician-language surnames
Portuguese-language surnames
Patronymic surnames